The list of ship launches in 1734 includes a chronological list of some ships launched in 1734.


References

1734
Ship launches